This is a list of finalists for the 2019 Archibald Prize for portraiture (listed is Artist – Title). As the images are copyrighted, an external link to an image has been listed where available.

Clara Adolphs – Rosemary Laing and Geoff Kleem (in their garden) 
John Beard – Edmund (+ Bill) (Portrait of Edmund Capon)
Natasha Bieniek – Waiting for Arden (Self-portrait)
Shane Bowden – Self-portrait sitting in a red chair, Avalon 
Keith Burt – Benjamin Law: happy sad
Tom Carment – Katoomba portrait – James Scanlon 
Jun Chen – Mao's last dancer – Li Cunxin 
Erika Cholich – Unadorned (self-portrait)  
Samuel Rush Condon – Self-portrait, Paris 
Luke Cornish – Cato, Callie and Comet (Portrait of Sue Cato)
Tony Costa - Lindy Lee (Winner: Archibald Prize 2019)
Jonathan Dalton – Sally. And her boys. (Portrait of Sally Anderson)
David Darcy – Tjuparntarri – women's business (Portrait of Daisy Tjuparntarri Ward) (Winner: People's Choice Award 2019)
Sinead Davies – The endocrinologist – Professor Katherine Samaras
Anh Do – Art and war (Portrait of George Gittoes)
Blak Douglas – White shells, black heart (Portrait of Esme Timbery)
Katherine Edney – Self-portrait with Ariel 
Marc Etherington – Idris Murphy and his dog Wally 
Carla Fletcher – Charge of the Star Goddess (((Del Kathryn Barton)))
Prudence Flint – The stand (Portrait of Richard Stringer)
Kendal Gear – Self-portrait  
Kate Gradwell – Yindyamarra: a portrait of Professor Michael McDaniel  
David Griggs – Tracing the antiquity of Jewish alchemy with Alexie Glass-Kantor 
Tsering Hannaford  – Mrs Singh (Portrait of Anant Singh)
Laura Jones – Nakkiah in her dressing room (Portrait of Nakkiah Lui)
Kirpy – Dylan (Portrait of Dylan Alcott)
Jasper Knight  – Jason Phu 
Kim Leutwyler – Faustina (Portrait of Faustina Agolley)
Mathew Lynn – Crow (Maddy Madden) 
Tessa MacKay – Through the looking glass (Portrait of David Wenham) (Winner: Packing Room Prize 2019)
Angus McDonald – Mariam Veiszadeh 
Euan Macleod – Four Rodneys (Portrait of Rodney Pople)
Bridgette McNab – Karla (Portrait of Karla Špetić)
Nigel Milsom – Judo house part 8 (a perfect light) (Self-portrait)
Vincent Namatjira – Art is our weapon – portrait of Tony Albert 
Ramesh Mario Nithiyendran – Multi-limbed self-portrait (after ceramic figures) 
Adam Norton – David Griggs, outta space 
Thea Anamara Perkins – Christian (Portrait of Christian Thompson)
Jude Rae – Sarah Peirse as Miss Docker in Patrick White's 'A cheery soul'''
Jordan Richardson – Annabel (Portrait of Annabel Crabb)
Paul Ryan – Self-portrait in the studio with the Beastie Boys, painting James Drinkwater for the Archibald Prize (Los amigos) 
Loribelle Spirovski – Meg and Amos (and Art) (Portrait of Megan Washington)
Vanessa Stockard – McLean (Portrait of McLean Edwards)
Clare Thackway – Billow and tide (Portrait of Lauren Brincat)
Imants Tillers – All hail Greg Inglis 
Michael Vale – Kid Congo on the island of the pink monkey birds 
Natasha Walsh – A liminal space (Self-portrait)
Mirra Whale – Leigh (Portrait of Leigh Sales)
Karyn Zamel – My self'' (Self-portrait)

See also 
Previous year: List of Archibald Prize 2018 finalists
Next year: List of Archibald Prize 2020 finalists
List of Archibald Prize winners

References

External links
Archibald Prize 2019 finalists official website

2019
Archibald
Archibald
Archibald Prize 2019
Archibald Prize 2019
Arch